is a trans-Neptunian object and the tenth-most-distant known object in the Solar System . Considered a detached object, it orbits the Sun in a highly eccentric orbit every 3,305 years at an average distance of 222 astronomical units (AU).

Description 

Mike Brown's website lists it as a possible dwarf planet with a diameter of  based on an assumed albedo of 0.04 . The albedo is expected to be low because the object has a blue (neutral) color. However, if the albedo is higher, the object could easily be half that size.

 and Sedna differ from scattered-disc objects in that they are not within the gravitational influence of the planet Neptune even at their perihelion distances (closest approaches to the Sun). It is something of a mystery as to how these objects came to be in their current, far-flung orbits. Several hypotheses have been put forward:
 They were pulled from their original positions by a passing star.
 They were pulled from their original positions by a very distant, and as-yet-undiscovered (albeit unlikely), giant planet.
 They were pulled from their original positions by an undiscovered companion star orbiting the Sun such as Nemesis.
 They were captured from another planetary system during a close encounter early in the Sun's history. According to Kenyon and Bromley, there is a 15% probability that a star like the Sun had an early close encounter and a 1% probability that outer planetary exchanges would have happened.  is estimated to be 2–3 times more likely to be a captured planetary object than Sedna.

It is one of eleven objects known with a semi-major axis greater than 100 AU and perihelion beyond 42 AU. It may be influenced by Planet Nine.

See also 
 
 
 Clearing the neighbourhood
 Planets beyond Neptune
 List of Solar System objects most distant from the Sun
 List of Solar System objects by greatest aphelion

References

External links 
 Orbit Determination of 
 Spacecraft escaping the Solar System (Heavens-Above)
 World Book: Worlds Beyond Pluto
 
 

148209
148209
Discoveries by Marc Buie
20000206